Edward Buck (29 October 1904 – 1993) was an English professional footballer who played as a wing half.

References

1904 births
1993 deaths
People from Dipton, County Durham
Footballers from County Durham
English footballers
Association football wing halves
West Stanley F.C. players
Leeds United F.C. players
Grimsby Town F.C. players
English Football League players